

Matches
Scores and results list England's points tally first.

Touring party

Manager: Clive Woodward
Assistant Manager: 
Captain:Kyran Bracken

Match details

References

Rugby union tours of Canada
Rugby union tours of the United States
England national rugby union team tours
Tour
2001 in Canadian rugby union
2001 in American rugby union